Taxidermy is the second studio album by American drag queen Sharon Needles. It was released on October 31, 2015 by Sidecar Records and Producer Entertainment Group, her first album on either label.

Background and promotion
Taxidermy is a departure from the "punk, metal, and electronica" of her previous album, PG-13, and marks a turn to straight EDM. Two singles were released to promote the album, "Dracula" on October 31, 2015 and "Hollywoodn't" on August 5, 2016. Both received accompanying music videos.

Tracklist

Charts

References

2015 albums
Dance music albums by American artists
Sharon Needles albums
Producer Entertainment Group albums